Nine ships of the British Royal Navy have been named HMS Penelope, after the faithful wife Penelope of Greek mythology.

 The first  was a 24-gun sixth rate launched in 1778 and captured by her Spanish prisoners in 1780.
 The second  was a 32-gun fifth rate launched in 1783 and broken up 1797.
 The third  was a 36-gun fifth rate launched in 1798 and wrecked in 1815.
 The fourth  was a 46-gun fifth rate launched in 1829 but completed in 1843 as a paddle frigate, and sold for breakup in 1864.
 The fifth  was an armoured corvette launched in 1867 that became a prison hulk in 1897 and was sold in 1912.
 The sixth  was an  light cruiser launched in 1914 and sold in 1924.
 The seventh  was a tender purchased in 1918 and sold in 1922.
 The eighth  was an  light cruiser launched in 1935 and sunk off Naples in 1944.
 The ninth  was a  launched in 1962 and sold to Ecuador in 1991, which operated her as Presidente Eloy Alfaro.

Battle honours
Ships named Penelope have earned the following battle honours:

Guillaume Tell, 1800
Egypt, 1801
Martinique, 1809
Baltic, 1854
Alexandria, 1882
Norway, 1940
Mediterranean, 1941−43
Malta Convoys, 1941−42
Sirte, 1942
Sicily, 1943
Salerno, 1943
Aegean, 1943
Anzio, 1944
Falkland Islands, 1982

See also
 Hired armed cutter 

Royal Navy ship names